Be Still is the third studio album by Donna Lewis. This album is only available for purchase from her website. The first two tracks were re-released with different arrangements on her fourth studio album, In The Pink.

Track listing

"Ireland" – 3:45
"Pink Dress" – 3:29
"Nowhere to Run" – 4:27
"Hands" – 3:27
"Sixth Sense" – 4:39
"Blutides" – 3:52
"After The Fire" – 3:31
"Fearless" – 2:52
"Moonbeam" – 4:23
"Be Still" – 2:30

References

External links
 Donna Lewis official website

2002 albums
Donna Lewis albums